Penguins of Madagascar (also known as Penguins of Madagascar: The Movie) is a 2014 American computer-animated spy action comedy film produced by DreamWorks Animation and Pacific Data Images and distributed by 20th Century Fox. Starring the voices of Tom McGrath, Chris Miller, Christopher Knights, Conrad Vernon, Benedict Cumberbatch, Ken Jeong, Annet Mahendru, Peter Stormare and John Malkovich, it is a spin-off of the Madagascar franchise and takes place directly after the events of Madagascar 3: Europe's Most Wanted (2012), following the penguins - Skipper, Kowalski, Rico and Private - as they join forces with the North Wind intelligence agency to stop the octopus Dave, who seeks revenge on all penguins across the world for being upstaged by capturing them. Apart from the main characters, it is not directly related to the Nickelodeon TV series of a similar name.

Directed by Eric Darnell and Simon J. Smith from a screenplay written by Michael Colton, John Aboud and Brandon Sawyer, Penguins of Madagascar was released theatrically in the United States on November 26, 2014 in 2D, 3D and RealD 3D formats, making it the only film in the Madagascar franchise to be distributed by 20th Century Fox as well as the final DreamWorks Animation film to be produced by Pacific Data Images prior to its closure on January 22, 2015, with DWA Glendale taking over. The film received generally positive reviews from critics, but despite grossing $373 million on a $132 million budget, the film underperformed by DreamWorks' standards, and resulted in a write-down $57.1 million for the studio.

Plot 

Ten years ago, Skipper, Rico, and Kowalski are penguin chick brothers in Antarctica. Upon seeing a runaway egg roll away from their colony, the trio rescue the egg from leopard seals and are set adrift on an iceberg. When the egg hatches, the trio adopt the baby penguin as their brother, Private.

In the present, the penguins leave Circus Zaragoza to celebrate Private's tenth birthday by breaking into Fort Knox to get a snack called Cheesy Dibbles from a vending machine, while Private desires to be recognized as an official member of the team, but is ignored. The penguins are subsequently kidnapped and taken to a submarine, where they are confronted by an octopus named Dave, who explains that he once lived in the Central Park Zoo as a star attraction until the penguins upstaged him with their cuteness. After being repeatedly upstaged by more penguins and passed between zoos and aquariums as an unwanted animal, a bitter Dave disguised himself as a human scientist Dr. Octavius Brine to enact his revenge. Rico swallows a vial of Dave’s bioweapon - the Medusa Serum - and his snow globe collection before the penguins escape.

Fleeing through Venice, Italy, while being pursued by Dave's henchmen, the penguins are rescued by the North Wind, an inter-species intelligence agency consisting of Classified, the wolf leader; polar bear weapons specialist Corporal; harp seal demolitionist Short Fuse; and snowy owl intelligence officer Eva. After Rico shows the North Wind the serum, Dave hacks into the North Wind’s computers to reveal he has more of it and more penguins start vanishing from exhibits all over the world. Upon deeming the penguins a liability to the mission, Classified darts and puts them on a plane bound for Madagascar.

The penguins escape the plane and, using Dave's snowglobes, deduce that the Shanghai Zoo is Dave's next target. Skipper's team forms a plan to stop Dave and Private reluctantly agrees to be the bait. The other penguins manage to trap Dave with a dinosaur skeleton after creating a water leak in the aquarium, just as the North Wind shows up. However, Dave escapes through a drain and captures Private and the rest of the Shanghai penguins, prompting Skipper, Rico, and Kowalski to hijack the North Wind's jet to pursue him, but it is blown up after the North Wind attempts to interfere. At Dave’s lair, Private learns that Dave is planning to use the Medusa Serum to turn penguins into mindless and disfigured monsters, so that the public will hate and exterminate them.

Upon reaching Dave’s hideout, the penguins and the North Wind clash over their different plans to infiltrate the submarine, before Skipper finally admits the North Wind to be more qualified and relents. The penguins distract the octopus guards while the North Wind sneak inside, but both teams are captured. Dave tests the Medusa Serum on Private, but he escapes with a paper clip he swallowed earlier at the last second, causing Dave and the rest of the penguins to believe he has been vaporized. Private frees the North Wind from torture devices and tries to convince them to help save the penguins, but they refuse, causing him to storm off on his own.

Dave uses the Medusa Serum to transform all the penguins, and, as Dr. Brine, unleashes them on New York City. In the chaos, Private obtains Dave's ray, chases down Skipper, Kowalski, and Rico and restores their sanity. As the penguins and the North Wind battle Dave and his henchmen, Private inserts himself into Dave’s ray using the power of his cuteness in order to restore the other penguins to normal, though leaving himself mutated and Dave shrunk and trapped inside one of his snow globes, which a little girl plays with. For his heroism, Private finally earns his place as a qualified member of the team and Classified congratulates the penguins and apologizes for misjudging them. As a reward, the North Wind gives the penguins jetpacks, which they use to fly back to Circus Zaragoza. In a mid-credits scene, the penguins use Mort’s cuteness to restore Private to normal.

Cast 

 Tom McGrath as Skipper, the leader of the penguins.
 Chris Miller as Kowalski, the brains of the penguins.
 Christopher Knights as Private, the rookie of the penguins.
 Conrad Vernon as Rico, the loose cannon of the penguins. Vernon replaces John DiMaggio as the voice of Rico in the film.
 Benedict Cumberbatch as Agent Classified, a Eurasian wolf with a British accent. He is the North Wind's team leader.
 Ken Jeong as Short Fuse, a Belgian white-coated harp seal and a member of the North Wind who serves as their expert in explosives and demolitions.
 Annet Mahendru as Eva, a Russian snowy owl with a matching accent, Kowalski's love interest/girlfriend, and the North Wind's intelligence analyst.
 Peter Stormare as Corporal, a Norwegian polar bear and a member of the North Wind who serves as the muscle.
 John Malkovich as Dave / Dr. Octavius Brine, a villainous and disgruntled Giant Pacific octopus who has a human disguise.
 Werner Herzog as Himself (credited as "Documentary Filmmaker".)
 Billy Eichner as New York Reporter
Danny Jacobs and Andy Richter voice King Julien XIII (in place of Sacha Baron Cohen) and Mort in the mid-credits scene.

Production 
A direct-to-video spin-off feature film featuring the Madagascar penguin characters had been in the works since 2005 when the first Madagascar film was released, with a release date initially planned for 2009. Years later, DreamWorks Animation announced in March 2011 that the penguins would be given their own theatrical film, directed by Simon J. Smith (the co-director of DreamWorks' Bee Movie) produced by Lara Breay, and written by Alan J. Schoolcraft and Brent Simons (the writers of DreamWorks' Megamind).

At the July 2012 Comic-Con, DreamWorks Animation announced that the film, then titled The Penguins of Madagascar, would be released in 2015. Bob Schooley, one of the developers of The Penguins of Madagascar series on Nickelodeon, said that the film would be unrelated to the TV series of the same name, but added that that could always change. In early September 2012, 20th Century Fox - the studio's new distributor - and DreamWorks Animation announced the film's release date of March 27, 2015 and a new team of screenwriters for the film, Michael Colton and John Aboud. Benedict Cumberbatch and John Malkovich joined the cast in August 2013. Malkovich, who had been offered the role of Dr. Octavius Brine three and a half years before the film's release, told an audience at the July 2014 Comic-Con that he thought that it "was a funny idea" to use his voice for an octopus.

Release

Theatrical
On May 20, 2014, the film's release date was moved up to November 26, 2014 from its initial March 27, 2015 date, switching places with DreamWorks Animation's other film Home. Jeffrey Katzenberg, DreamWorks Animation's CEO, explained that the film, coming from one of DWA's most successful franchises, would have an easier task to stand out around the Thanksgiving holiday season while Home was to try taking advantage of a less competitive spring release window and repeat successful spring launches of some of DWA's original films, such as The Croods and How to Train Your Dragon. The film was released two weeks earlier in China on November 14, 2014, where it was released by Oriental DreamWorks.

The film was released in RealD 3D and Digital 3D formats. It was digitally remastered into the IMAX format, and released in select theaters across Europe, Asia, the Middle East and Latin America. A four-issue comic book series based on the film was published by Titan Comics, written by Alex Matthews and drawn by Lucas Fereyra.

Home media 
Penguins of Madagascar was released on DVD, Blu-ray and Blu-ray 3D on March 17, 2015. It topped the home video sales chart in its first week.

Reception

Box office 
Penguins of Madagascar grossed $83.4 million in North America and $290.2 million in foreign countries for a worldwide total of $373.6 million. The film's production budget was $132 million, which, according to the DreamWorks Animation's president Ann Dally, excluded "incentive-based compensation." By the end of 2014, the studio had to take a $57.1 million write-down, primarily related to the performances of Penguins of Madagascar and another DreamWorks Animation film, Mr. Peabody & Sherman.

Penguins of Madagascar was released on November 26, 2014, in North America and Canada across 3,764 theatres. It earned $6.25 million on its opening day and $3.95 million the next day on Thanksgiving Day. It earned $10.5 million on Black Friday. The film underperformed during its opening weekend earning $25.4 million and debuting at #2 at the box office behind The Hunger Games: Mockingjay – Part 1, for which 3D accounted for 24% of its opening-weekend gross. The opening-weekend audience was evenly split among those under and over the age of 25, with 58% and female accounted 51%.

The film was released in China on November 14, two weeks ahead of its North American debut, and earned $11.3 million from 3,500 screens, debuting at number two at the Chinese box office behind Interstellar ($42 million). In its opening weekend, the film earned $36.5 million from 47 markets. Overall, the top openings were in Russia ($8.2 million), Korea ($6 million), Italy ($4.63 million), Germany ($4.2 million), and Australia ($3.68 million). The film's opening in Germany was the second-highest for an animated film in 2014, behind How to Train Your Dragon 2.

Critical response 
The site's critical consensus reads, "Penguins of Madagascar is fast and brightly colored enough to entertain small children, but too frantically silly to offer real filmgoing fun for the whole family." On Metacritic, the film achieved a score of 53 out of 100 based on reviews from 31 critics, indicating "mixed or average reviews". Audiences surveyed by CinemaScore gave the film an average grade of "A−" on an A+ to F scale.

Elizabeth Weitzman of the New York Daily News gave the film three out of five stars, saying "Granted, it's no classic, but a sassy script and good-natured voice work from Benedict Cumberbatch and John Malkovich should keep kids and grownups entertained over the holidays." Ignatiy Vishnevetsky of The A.V. Club gave the film a B, saying "Frenetic and frequently funny, Penguins Of Madagascar represents the DreamWorks Animation franchise style—which boils down to self-aware, but naïve, talking animals who learn kid-friendly life lessons—at its most palatable." Ben Kenigsberg of The New York Times gave the film a positive review, saying "The lack of originality is offset by sheer silliness, including Classified and Skipper's Abbott and Costello-style argument over whether there's a long I in 'diversion.' The word fits the movie."

Bill Zwecker of the Chicago Sun-Times gave the film three out of four stars, saying "Once again the Madagascar team have come up with a winner – a nice way to kick off the Thanksgiving and holiday filmgoing experience for the whole family." Lou Lumenick of the New York Post gave the film one out of four stars, saying "Penguins of Madagascar is a lazy, noisy ADHD-addled collection of animated clichés guaranteed to give anyone older than 5 a headache, even if you don't see it in optional 3-D." Michael Rechtshaffen of The Hollywood Reporter gave the film a negative review, saying "While there are plenty of madcap antics to fill a feature, all that manic energy ultimately proves to be more exhausting than exhilarating." Jeff Labrecque of Entertainment Weekly gave the film a C−, saying "Penguins of Madagascar aims primarily for the kiddies, racing from one frenetic action sequence to another like some haywire Walter Lantz cartoon."

Accolades

Soundtrack 

Lorne Balfe composed the original score for the film, making it his first solo debut in a DreamWorks Animation film. Balfe wrote the additional music for the previous two Madagascar films and helped Madagascar composer Hans Zimmer with the score for Megamind. The soundtrack was released on November 21, 2014, by Relativity Music Group. Relativity also released an EP, Penguins of Madagascar: Black & White Christmas Album, which featured five holiday songs.  Pitbull performed a song titled "Celebrate" for the film, which was played during the credits. A music video of the song was also released on YouTube in October 21, 2014.

Video game 
A video game based on the film, titled Penguins of Madagascar, and published by Little Orbit, was released on November 25, 2014, for Nintendo 3DS, Wii, and Wii U.

References

External links 

 
 

2014 films
Madagascar (franchise) films
2014 3D films
2014 computer-animated films
2014 action comedy films
2010s spy comedy films
2010s American animated films
2010s children's comedy films
American 3D films
American computer-animated films
American action comedy films
American spy comedy films
American children's animated action films
American children's animated comedy films
Animated films about animals
Animated films about penguins
Animated films about wolves
Animated films set in Manhattan
20th Century Fox animated films
20th Century Fox films
DreamWorks Animation animated films
3D animated films
Film spin-offs
Films directed by Eric Darnell
Films directed by Simon J. Smith
Films scored by Lorne Balfe
Films about polar bears
Films set in Shanghai
Films set in Venice
Films set in zoos
IMAX films
2010s English-language films